, sometimes translated as Sabu and Ichi's Detective Stories/Tales and Sabu and Ichi's Arrest Warrant, is a Japanese manga series by Shotaro Ishinomori originally published in Weekly Shōnen Sunday from 1966 to 1967. In April 1968, the series moved to serialization in the first issue of Big Comic, where it was published until the series ended four years later in the April 10, 1972 issue.

The manga was adapted into a black and white anime television series which aired on NET from October 3, 1968, to September 24, 1969. The series won the 1968 Shogakukan Manga Award.

In addition to the manga and anime series, a live action period drama series was aired on Fuji TV from 1981 to 1982 as part of their Jidaigeki Special series. A total of four specials were created and aired. Sabu and Ichi were played by veteran actors Tomokazu Miura and Tatsuo Umemiya (respectively), with Yūko Natori and Junzaburō Ban playing the parts of Midori and her father, Saheiji. On December 19, 2015, a live action film was released starring Teppei Koike, Kenichi Endō and Akemi Masuda.

Plot
The series follows the adventures of Sabu, a young Edo bakufu investigator traveling with the blind master swordsman Ichi. In their travels, they assist the common people in solving mysteries and righting wrongs (usually committed by bandits or corrupt officials). Sabu is engaged to Midori, the daughter of his boss, who works as a police officer for the Tokugawa shogunate.

Main characters

Voiced by: Kei Tomiyama (ep.1-33), Makio Inoue (ep. 34–52)
A handsome young warrior and apprentice thief-taker who works for Saheiji a police detective. His main weapon is a jitte attached to a long hemp rope, and he is an expert in using it to capture villains in order to turn them over to the authorities. He was originally an orphan from a poor village.

A blind anma masseur who is also a master swordsman. He is a close friend of Sabu and frequently helps him capture criminals. His sword is similar to the one used by Zatoichi. All of the hair on his head (including eyebrows) is shaved, and his eyes are milky-white due to his blindness. He lost his sight due to being kicked in the face by a horse when he was very young, and he trained with the sword since that time.

Saheiji's daughter and Sabu's fiancé.

A police detective, and Sabu's boss. He has a weak constitution, however, so spends a lot of time in bed. He generally only goes out in order to arrest those captured by Sabu.

Voiced by: Osamu Kobayashi
Sabu and Saheiji's boss. The equivalent of a chief of police for the Edo bakufu.

Sources:

Media

Anime episode list

References

Shotaro Ishinomori
1966 manga
1968 anime television series debuts
1981 Japanese television series debuts
Fuji TV original programming
Historical anime and manga
20th-century Japanese novels
Japanese television dramas based on manga
Seinen manga
Shogakukan manga
TV Asahi original programming
Winners of the Shogakukan Manga Award for general manga
Toei Animation television